Ángel Custodio Loyola (September 4, 1926 – September 24, 1985), was a Venezuelan singer and composer, known as a pioneer in the joropo genre.  He wrote many popular songs, including "El Gavilán", "Tierra Negra", "Carnaval", "Sentimiento Llanero", "Catira Marmolereña", "Faenas Llaneras", and "Puerto Miranda". He is considered to have been one of the greatest exponents of llanera music.

Partial discography 
Pasaje contramarcado (Discomoda DCM-119)
Buenos Aires llaneros (Discomoda DCM-195)
Sentimiento llanero (Discomoda DCM-246)
Corrío Apureño (Discomoda DCM-256)
El guachamarón (Discomoda DCM-287)
Travesias de Mata Larga (Discomoda DCM-298)
El tigre de Masaguarito (Discomoda DCM-414)
Señores, Aquí está un llanero (Discomoda DCM-462)
Ay! Catira Marmoleña (Discomoda DCM-623)
Sentir Venezolano (Philips 40.097)
El Indio Modesto Laya (Palacio LPS-66.386)
El Guariqueño si sabe (Cachilapo LPC-017)

Compilations
El Disco de Oro de Ángel C. Loyola (Discomoda DCM-973)
Ángel C. Loyola-El Carrao-Eneas Perdomo (Discomoda LP-TB 1402)
Bravos del Canto Llanero (Discomoda DCM ER-20010)
Clásicos llaneros de Ángel Custodio Loyola (Discomoda 601537)
Loyola y El Carrao (Foca Records FD-43398673)

See also 
Venezuelan music

References
 Casanares, Juan - Ángel Custodio Loyola : Todo el llano en la voz (El Nacional, Caracas, September 7, 1980)
 Hernández Camacho, Pedro - Al rescate de la música criolla (Elite Magazine, Caracas, June 19, 1969)
 Medina, Vicente - Cosas de cantadores (El Nacional, Caracas, May 28, 1977)
 Vallejo, Raúl - Se despidió El Pajarillo. Custodio permanente de nuestra música (El Nacional, September 25, 1985)
 Enciclopedia de la Música en Venezuela, (ed. Fundación Bigott Caracas, Venezuela, 1998)
Últimas Noticias, July 17, 2009. “Punto Criollo” by Alfredo Cisneros

External links 
International Jose Guillermo Carrillo Foundation
Songs of Ángel C. Loyola at www.llanera.com
Poem dedicated to Loyola at www.lablaa.org

1926 births
1985 deaths
People from Guárico
Venezuelan composers
Male composers
Venezuelan folk singers
20th-century Venezuelan male singers
20th-century composers